Gary Wilson may refer to:

 Gary L. Wilson, American businessman
 Gary Wilson (author) (1956–2021), author and activist
 Gary Wilson (politician) (born 1946), Canadian politician
 Gary Wilson (musician) (born 1953), American experimental musician
 Gary Wilson (snooker player) (born 1985), English snooker player
 Gary Wilson (cricketer) (born 1986), Irish cricketer
 Gary Wilson (racing driver), former American racing driver, see 1975 Long Beach Grand Prix
 Gary Wilson (rugby union), rugby union footballer who represented the United States

Baseball 
 Gary Wilson (second baseman) (1879–1969), Major League Baseball second baseman for the Boston Americans
 Gary Wilson (1970s pitcher) (born 1954), former Major League Baseball pitcher for the Houston Astros
 Gary Wilson (1990s pitcher) (born 1970), former Major League Baseball pitcher for the Pittsburgh Pirates

See also
 Garry Wilson (born 1953), Australian rules footballer (nicknamed "Flea")
 Garry Wilson (footballer) (born 1963), former Scottish footballer